Cantharus may refer to: 

Cantharus (Christianity), a fountain used by Christians for making ablutions
Kantharos (also spelled cantharus), a Greek drinking cup
Kantharos (also spelled Cantharus), an ancient Athenian comic poet
Kantharos (also spelled Cantharus), a harbour in ancient Athens
Sea snails in the family Pisaniidae, including:
Cantharus, a genus of sea snails
Common cantharus (Gemophos auritulus)
Measle-mouth cantharus (Gemophos sanguinolentus)
Ringed cantharus (Gemophos ringens)
Tinted or painted cantharus (Gemophos tinctus) 
Ribbed cantharus (Hesperisternia multangula)